Microvirga vignae  is a nitrogen-fixing bacteria from the genus of Microvirga which has been isolated from the Brazilian Semiarid region.

References

Further reading 
 
 

Hyphomicrobiales
Bacteria described in 2014